E-society is a society that consists of one or more e-Communities involved in the areas from e-Government, e-Democracy, and  e-Business to e-Learning and e-Health, that use information and communication technologies (ICT) in order to achieve a common interests and goals. The first areas of e-society that emerged were e-Learning and e-Business. Further development and challenges of e-Society depend on the use of new ICT technology and IoT in supporting smart media and smart information services.

The development of e-Society is relying and depending on the development of virtual reality (VR) technologies that insure interaction between participants of an e-Society in a more acceptable and tangible way. The development of (VR) and consequently the e-Society is based on improvement and balancing of participants’ interaction methods, hardware necessary for such interaction, content presentation and effort required for development and maintenance.

References

External links 
 Virtual reality in the e-Society 

Internet culture
Virtual reality
Community building
Social influence
Social information processing
Information society
Community websites
Social software